Brigidine College is an independent Roman Catholic secondary day school for girls, located in the suburb of Indooroopilly less than  from the centre of Brisbane, Queensland, Australia. It was established in 1929 by the Congregation of the Sisters of Saint Brigid and continues in their tradition of Strength and Gentleness today.

It is affiliated with the Association of Heads of Independent Schools of Australia (AHISA), the Alliance of Girls' Schools Australasia (AGSA), and the Catholic Secondary Schoolgirls' Sports Association(CaSSSA).

History
The College was founded by the Brigidine Sisters in 1929. The school motto - "Fortiter et Suaviter" (translated as Strength and Gentleness (French)), is reflected in every aspect of the school's activities and policies. During 2014, a number of celebrations were held to mark the school's 85 year anniversary including:
The new Foley House, blessed as the sixth House.
The exciting new Middle Years Learning Centre, with specialist facilities for Years 7–9, opened.
A Whole School Photo marking the largest enrolment of students in the College's 85-year history.
The Kildare Ministries was launched. The establishment of this Public Juridic Person reflects a new movement in the governance and leadership of works within the Church and includes the educational services and community works of both the Brigidine Sisters Australia and Presentation Sisters Victoria. Brigidine College is now under the care of Kildare Ministries in the tradition of the Brigidine Sisters.

House system
There are six Houses at Brigidine College:
Chanel (Red House, named after Saint Peter Chanel) symbol: flame
Delany (Gold House, named after Daniel Delany) symbol: lion
Damien (Blue House, named after Damien de Veuster) symbol: eagle
De Porres (Green House, named after Saint Martin de Porres) symbol: dragon
MacKillop (Jacaranda House, named after Mary MacKillop) symbol: phoenix
Foley (Magenta House, named after Mother Brigid Foley, the foundation Principal) symbol: Love Heart 
Each house is led by two House Captains, who are also known as Prefects. Each girl's House is like her 'family' at school.

See also 

 List of schools in Queensland
 Catholic education in Australia

References

External links
 Official website

Educational institutions established in 1929
Catholic secondary schools in Brisbane
Girls' schools in Queensland
Indooroopilly, Queensland
1929 establishments in Australia
Brigidine schools
Alliance of Girls' Schools Australasia